Helene Valerie Hayman, Baroness Hayman,  (née Middleweek; born 26 March 1949) is a British politician who was Lord Speaker of the House of Lords in the Parliament of the United Kingdom. As a member of the Labour Party she was a Member of Parliament from 1974 to 1979, and became a life peer in 1996.

Outside politics, she has been involved in health issues, serving on medical ethics committees and the governing bodies of bodies in the National Health Service and health  charities. In 2006, she won the inaugural election for the newly created position of Lord Speaker.

Early life, education and early career
The daughter of Maurice (a dentist) and Maude Middleweek, Hayman attended Wolverhampton Girls' High School and read law at Newnham College, Cambridge, graduating in 1969; she was President of the Cambridge Union Society in 1969. She worked for Shelter from 1969 to 1971, and for the Social Services Department at the London Borough of Camden from 1971 to 74, when she was named Deputy Director of the National Council for One-Parent Families.

Personal life
She married Martin Heathcote Hayman (born 20 December 1942) in 1974; they have four sons.

Political career
She participated on William F. Buckley's Firing Line television programs in January 1972 as a member of a panel discussing "The Irish Problem" and featuring then-MP Bernadette Devlin McAliskey. and again on the 20th August 1973 episode with Malcolm Muggeridge on the theme "Has America Had It?".

She contested the Wolverhampton South West constituency in the February 1974 election. She was elected as the Member of Parliament for Welwyn and Hatfield in the October 1974 general election. On her election, she was the youngest member of the House of Commons, remaining the "Baby of the House" until the by-election victory of Andrew MacKay in 1977. She was the first woman to breastfeed at Westminster. She lost her seat, a marginal, to the Conservative Christopher Murphy at the 1979 general election.

She was a member of the Bloomsbury Health Authority (later Bloomsbury and Islington Health Authority) from 1985 to 1992, and its Vice-Chair from 1988 onwards.
She served on the ethics committees of the Royal College of Gynaecologists from 1982 to 1997, and of the University College London and University College Hospital from 1987 to 1997. From 1992 to 1997, she was a member of the Council of University College, London, and chair of Whittington Hospital NHS Trust.

Hayman was made a life peer on 2 January 1996, and took the title Baroness Hayman, of Dartmouth Park in the London Borough of Camden. After the Labour Party won the 1997 general election, she served as a junior minister in the Department for Environment, Transport and the Regions and the Department of Health, before being appointed Minister of State at the Ministry of Agriculture, Fisheries and Food in July 1999.

She became a member of the Privy Council in 2001, but left political office the same year to become chairman of Cancer Research UK (2001–2005). She became chair of the Human Tissue Authority in 2005. She was a Trustee of the Royal Botanic Gardens, Kew (2002–2006) and of the Tropical Health and Education Trust (2005–2006). She was a member of the Human Fertilisation and Embryology Authority in 2005–2006. She was a member of the Lords Select Committee on the Assisted Dying for the Terminally Ill Bill, 2004–2005, and of the Lords Constitution Committee, 2005–2006.

Lord Speaker
In May 2006, after the position of Speaker in the House of Lords was separated from the office of Lord Chancellor as part of the reforms under the Constitutional Reform Act 2005, she was one of nine candidates to be put forward for the new role of Lord Speaker. She was nominated as a candidate by Baroness Symons of Vernham Dean and seconded by Lord Walton of Detchant. Her narrow victory in the election was announced on 4 July 2006 and she became the first ever Lord Speaker. On her election, Lord McNally, the Liberal Democrat leader in the House of Lords, called her the "Julie Andrews of British politics". Like the Speaker in the House of Commons, but unlike the Lord Chancellor who was also a judge and a government minister, the Lord Speaker resigns party membership and outside interests to concentrate on being an impartial presiding officer. 

On 2 March 2011, Hayman gave a lecture to the Mile End Group in the Attlee Suite of Portcullis House. This was the third in a lecture series to commemorate the 1911 Parliament Act. On 9 May 2011, Hayman announced that she would not seek re-election for a second term as Lord Speaker; her successor was Baroness D'Souza.

Honours and awards
Dame Grand Cross of the Order of the British Empire in the 2012 New Year Honours for services to the House of Lords.
On 21 September 2010: copy of the key of the city of Tirana on a visit to Albania at the invitation of the Speaker of the Albanian Parliament.
 Honorary Fellow, Newnham College, Cambridge

See also
 List of residents of Wolverhampton

References

External links 

 A lecture on House of Lords reform delivered by Baroness Hayman at the Parliament of the United Kingdom on  YouTube

Offices held

|-

1949 births
Living people
People from Wolverhampton
Female members of the Parliament of the United Kingdom for English constituencies
Dames Grand Cross of the Order of the British Empire
Labour Party (UK) MPs for English constituencies
Labour Party (UK) life peers
Labour Friends of Israel
Life peeresses created by Elizabeth II
Members of the Privy Council of the United Kingdom
Crossbench life peers
Presidents of the Cambridge Union
UK MPs 1974–1979
Alumni of Newnham College, Cambridge
Fellows of Newnham College, Cambridge
People educated at Wolverhampton Girls' High School
Lords Speaker
20th-century British women politicians
20th-century English women
20th-century English people